This list includes libraries located in New York City active in the 19th century. Included are public libraries, academic libraries, medical libraries, church libraries, government libraries, circulating libraries, and subscription libraries.

A
 Academy of Mt. St. Vincent library
 Aguilar Free Library (est.1886)
 Aldine Club
 American Bible Society
 American Bible Union
 American Congregational Union
 American Ethnological Society
 American and Foreign Bible Society
 American Geographical and Statistical Society
 American Institute (est.1828)
 American Institute of Mining Engineers Library
 American Literary Association
 American Museum of Natural History library
 American Numismatic and Archaeological Society
 American Seaman's Friend Society
 American Society of Civil Engineers
 American Society of Mechanical Engineers
 Anglo-African Reading Room, Prince St. (est.1859)
 Apprentices and Demilt Library, General Society of Mechanics and Tradesmen of the City of New York
 Aschenbroedel Verein Library
 Association of the Bar of the City of New York
 Astor Library
 William H. Atree's circulating library

B
 Bacon Literary Association
 Bancroft Institute
 Samuel Berrian's circulating library
 Bowery Circulating Library; Caleb Bartlett
 Boys' Free Reading Room
 Broome Street Free Library

C
 Hocquet Caritat's circulating library
 Cathedral Free Circulating Library
 Catholic Club Library
 Children's library
 City Library
 Clinton Place Female Seminary
 College of Pharmacy of City of New York
 College of Physicians and Surgeons
 College of St. Francis Xavier
 College of Veterinary Surgeons Library
 College Settlement Library
 James Collins' circulating library
 Colored Home and Hospital Library
 Colored Orphan Asylum Library
 Columbia College
 Cooper Institute
 Courtland-Street Library; William Stodart

D 

 De Witt Memorial Free Library

E 

 Ecelectic Medical College Library
 Episcopal Historical Society
 Episcopal Theological Seminary
 Equitable Life Assurance Social Law Library

F 

 Five Points Mission
 Francis' circulating library
 Franklin Library; Mr. Lockwood
 Free Academy
 Free Circulating Library for the Blind

G 

 Gaelic Society
 Genealogical and Biographical Society Library
 General Theological Seminary Library
 German Hospital and Dispensary Library
 A.T. Goodrich's circulating library
 Grammar School no.21, Holbrook Library
 Grolier Club (est.1884)

H 

 Harlem Law Library
 Harlem Library
 Health Department library
 Helmich & Co.'s German circulating library
 Horsfall's French circulating library
 House of Detention for Witnesses library
 House of Refuge

I 

 I.O. of O.F. Library
 Institute for the Deaf and Dumb
 Institution for the Blind
 Irving Literary Union
 Italian Free Reading-Room and Library

J 

 Juvenile Asylum

K 

 Adolph Kirsten's German library

L 

 La Salle Academy library
 Lenox Library (est.1871)
 Liter. Geselleschaft of Morrisania library
 Lorraine library
 Lyceum of Natural History

M 

 Maimonides Library Association
 Manhattan College Library
 Maritime Exchange library
 Masonic Library
 Mechanical Engineers Library
 Mechanics' Institute (est.1830)
 Medical College and Hospital for Women library
Mercantile Library Association (est.1820)
 Merchants' and Clerks' Library Association
 Metropolis Law School library
 Metropolitan Medical College
Metropolitan Museum of Art library
 Military Service Inst. library
 Minerva circulating library; W.B. Gilley
 John Montgomery's circulating library
 Mott Memorial Medical and Surg. library
 E. M. Murden's Circulating Library and Dramatic Repository

N 

 New-York Athenaeum (est.1824)
 New York City Library
 New York City Lunatic Asylum
New York Free Circulating Library
New York Historical Society
 New York Hospital
New York Law Institute
 New York Law School library
New York Medical College
 New York Normal College library
 New York Port Society Library
New York Public Library (est.1895)
 New-York Sacred Music Society (est.1823)
New York Society Library
 New York State Colonization Society, Omacatl Society

O 

 Odd Fellows' Library
 Olivet Library
 Joseph Osborn's circulating library

P 

 Parthenon Circulating Library and Reading Room
 Peck Memorial Library
Players' Club library
 Post grad. med. school and hospital library
 G.B. Powell's Book Store and Circulating Library, 134 Bowery
 Presbyterian Board of Foreign Missions
 Printers' Free Library (est.1823)
 Prison Association library
 Produce Exchange library
 Public School, 14th Ward
 Public School (20th Ward) Library

R 

 William Radde's German circulating library
 Railroad Men's Building library
 Riverside Free Library
 Rutgers Female Institute

S 

 St. Agnes' Free Library
 St. Barnabas' Free Reading Room
 St. George's Free Circulating Library
 St. John's College library
 St. Luke's Hospital
 St. Mark's Memorial Chapel, free library
 Seamen's library, Pike St.
 Seamen's Friend Society Library
Spingler Institute (est.1849), Union Square
 John Stagner's circulating library

T 

 Teacher's College, Bryson Library
 Trow Directory library

U 

 Union Theological Seminary
 University Club Library library
 University of the City of New York
 University Settlement library (est.1892)

W 

 Webster Free Circulating Library (est.1894)
 Washington Heights Free Library, Amsterdam Ave.
 Washington Institute
 Westermann's German circulating library
 T. Whybrew's circulating library
 Helen Williams' circulating library
 Woman's Library, no.19 Clinton Place
 Women's Free Reading-Room and Library, no.16 Clinton Place
 Women's Medical College of New York
 Workingmen's Free Reading-Room and Library

Y 

 YMCA of Greater New York
 YMCA
 YWCA library (est.1870)

See also
 Books in the United States
 List of New York Public Library Branches

References

Further reading
 
 E. Porter Belden. "Literature, Science, and Taste." New York, past, present, and future: comprising a history of the city of New York, a description of its present condition, and an estimate of its future increase. NY: Putnam, 1849
 Libraries in New York City. Norton's Literary and Educational Register for 1854.
 "New York (City): Free Circulating Libraries." American annual cyclopaedia and register of important events of the year 1886. NY: Appleton & Co., 1889
 "Libraries and Reading Rooms." King's handbook of New York City, 2nd ed. 1893.
 "Libraries of New York." James Grant Wilson. The memorial history of the City of New-York: from its first settlement to the year 1892, Volume 4. New York History Co., 1893
 Statistics of New York Libraries for 1894. State Library Bulletin, June 1895
 "Libraries in New York City." Public Libraries 1:7, Nov. 1896
 "Libraries of the City of New York." Libraries of Greater New York. NY: New York Library Club, 1902
 Hedbavny, L. "Some Leisure-Time Organizations in New York City, 1830-1870: Clubs, Lyceums, and Libraries." Master's thesis, New York University, 1952.
 Harold Augenbraum. New York's Oldest Public Libraries. RBM 1 no2 (2000), 145-60
 T. Glynn. Books in the public sphere: New York libraries and the culture-building enterprise (dissertation). Auburn University, NY.

External links

 Princeton University. Davies Project. American Libraries before 1876.
 New York Public Library. Photo of Aguilar Free Circulating Library East Broadway, Reference Room
 New York Public Library. Photo of New York Free Circulating Library, Branch no. 1, 1899

 
Libraries in New York City
United States history-related lists
New York City
19th century in New York City
New York City-related lists
Libraries, 19th century